Rannvá Biskopstø Andreasen (born 10 November 1980) is a Faroese football forward for KÍ Klaksvík of the Faroese 1. deild kvinnur. Since 2004, she has represented the Faroe Islands women's national football team at senior international level. She is the national team's all-time record goalscorer, inclusive of both male and female players.

Club career

In 1995, aged 14, Andreasen made her 1. deild kvinnur debut for KÍ Klaksvík in an 11–0 thrashing by rivals HB Tórshavn. Despite the inauspicious start Andreasen emerged as a promising player and finished her first season with 15 goals. In 1997 she was the league's top goalscorer for the first time with 28 goals as KÍ won the championship. In 2000, KÍ won a league and cup double, beating HB Tórshavn 2–0 in the cup final.

As of 2013, KÍ have won the league title every season since 2000, with Andreasen as top goalscorer on 11 occasions, including in 2003 when she scored a record 46 goals. She also collected ten Faroese Women's Cup winner's medals.

Andreasen has made 50 appearances and scored 16 goals for KÍ in the UEFA Women's Champions League, formerly known as the UEFA Women's Cup. Her debut came in October 2001, in the first round of the inaugural 2001–02 competition held in Helsinki. Andreasen scored both goals in KÍ's opening 2–1 win over Austrians USC Landhaus Wien, but the team then lost 4–0 to hosts HJK and Italian champions Torres and were eliminated.

International career

The Faroe Islands Football Association (FSF) relaunched their senior women's national team in 2004 after an eight-year hiatus. Andreasen played the whole of their first match, a 2–1 friendly defeat to Ireland. The match was staged in Klaksvík on 12 October 2004, the day before the nations' senior men's teams met at Lansdowne Road, Dublin.

In the next match, a return friendly with Ireland at the Oscar Traynor Centre in Dublin, Andreasen put the Faroe Islands ahead after six minutes. Ireland hit back to win 2–1.

Andreasen was part of the squad as the Faroe Islands won the football tournament at the 2005 Island Games in Shetland. She struck two goals in a 3–0 win over Bermuda and contributed four to the 12–0 defeat of Guernsey in the gold medal match.

Andreasen's first matches in UEFA competition came in the UEFA Women's Euro 2009 qualifying series. At a preliminary round mini-tournament held in Strumica, Macedonia, the Faroe Islands lost 2–1 to Wales and 1–0 to Kazakhstan, but then beat hosts Macedonia 7–0. Andreasen plundered four goals in a result which remained the Faroe Islands' record win, until their 8–0 thrashing of Andorra on 6 April 2015 with Rannvá again netting four goals.

In 2012, Andreasen and her KÍ teammates Randi Wardum and Malena Josephsen simultaneously became the first female Faroese players to win 25 caps. She holds the record for most matches and scored goals for the Faroe Islands; as of 25 October 2017 she has played 51 matches and scored 26 goals.

In March 2020 Andreasen announced that the friendly match against Estonia on 9 March 2020 was her last international for the Faroe Islands.  She came in as a substitute after 81 minutes. She scored the 1-1 goal seven minutes later, which was also the final result of the match.

Personal life
For much of her career at club and international level, Andreasen has played alongside her twin Ragna Patawary. She is also the aunt of Faroese international footballer Jákup Andreasen.

International goals
Scores and results list Faroe Islands' goal tally first.

References

External links
 Rannvá B. Andreasen at Faroesoccer.com
 Rannvá B. Andreasen at UEFA.com
 Rannvá B. Andreasen at Kvinnufotbolt.com

1980 births
Living people
Women's association football forwards
Faroese women's footballers
People from Klaksvík
Faroe Islands women's international footballers
Twin sportspeople
Faroese twins
LGBT association football players
Faroese LGBT people